Savitri or Savithrri may refer to:

In Hinduism
 Savitri, with all vowels short, a Roman-phonetic spelling of the Rigvedic solar deity Savitr
Sāvitrī, a name of the Gayatri Mantra dedicated to Savitr
Savitri (goddess), the consort of Brahma, a form of Saraswati
Name of a manifestation of Prakṛti
Savitri, a Hindu character from the story of Savitri and Satyavan in the epic Mahabharata

Inspired by story of Savitri and Satyavan
Savitri Brata, a fasting day observed by Hindu Oriya married women
Savitri (opera), a 1916 opera by Gustav Holst
Szávitri, a 1998 opera by Sándor Szokolay
Savitri (1933 film), a 1933 Telugu film
Savitri (1937 film), a Hindi film
Savithiri (1941 film), a Tamil film
Savitri (2016 film), a Telugu film
Savitri: A Legend and a Symbol, an epic poem by Sri Aurobindo published in 1950 and 1951
Savitri - EK Prem Kahani, a 2013 Indian television series

People

Savitri (actress) (1935–1981), Indian actress
Savitri Hensman, London-based activist and writer
Savitri Devi, born Maximiani Julia Portas, Greek-English-French proponent of Nazism who served as a spy for the Axis Powers in India

Other
Savitri River, a river in India
Savitri (TV series) (2013), an Indian supernatural television series
INS Savitri (P53), an Indian warship

See also
Sati Savitri (disambiguation)

Indian feminine given names